Maurice Darnell Greene (born July 5, 1986) is an American professional mixed martial artist who competes in the Heavyweight division. He appeared on The Ultimate Fighter 28 TV series. He has formerly competed in the Ultimate Fighting Championship (UFC).

Background
Greene started training mixed martial arts in his early 20s to lose weight after hitting the scale at 330 pounds. He later moved from Chicago to St. Cloud, Minnesota and began training at START Brazilian Jiu-Jitsu Academy under Brock Larson where he started to compete in mixed martial arts (MMA).

Kickboxing career
Greene competed for Glory kickboxing where he went 1 - 3 with one KO. Greene's overall record in kickboxing is 4 - 4 with two KO's.

Mixed martial arts career

Early career 
Greene started his professional MMA career since 2012 and amassed a record of 5–2 prior participated in The Ultimate Fighter 28 UFC TV mma competition series which he was subsequently signed by UFC after the show.

The Ultimate Fighter
In August 2017, it was announced that Greene was one of the fighters featured on The Ultimate Fighter 28 UFC TV series. Greene was the third pick of the heavyweight fighters by coach Kelvin Gastelum. In the quarter-finals, he faced Przemyslaw Mysiala and won the fight via knockout in the first round. In the semi-finals, Greene faced  Juan Espino. and he lost the fight via a submission in round one.

Ultimate Fighting Championship

Greene made his UFC debut on November 20, 2018 against Michel Batista at The Ultimate Fighter 28 Finale. He won the fight via a submission in the first round.

His next fight came on March 9, 2019 replacing injured Daniel Spitz, a rematch against Jeff Hughes at UFC Fight Night: Lewis vs. dos Santos. He won the fight via a split decision.

Greene faced Júnior Albini on June 29, 2019 at UFC on ESPN: Ngannou vs. dos Santos. He won the fight via first-round technical knockout.

Greene faced Sergei Pavlovich on October 26, 2019 at UFC on ESPN+ 20.  He lost the fight via technical knockout in the first round.

Greene faced Aleksei Oleinik on January 18, 2020 at UFC 246. He lost the fight via a submission in the second round.

Greene faced Gian Villante on June 27, 2020 at UFC on ESPN: Poirier vs. Hooker. He won the fight via an arm-triangle choke submission from the bottom in the third round.

Greene faced Greg Hardy on October 31, 2020 at UFC Fight Night 181. He lost the fight via technical knockout in round two.

Greene faced Marcos Rogério de Lima on May 8, 2021 at UFC on ESPN 24. He lost the fight via unanimous decision.

On May 11, Greene announced that he was released from the UFC.

Post UFC 
Greene made his first appearance since leaving the UFC against Danyelle Williams at CES 68 on May 6, 2022. He won the bout via arm-triangle choke in the first round.

Greene faced Denis Goltsov on June 24, 2022 at PFL 5. He lost the bout via unanimous decision, getting out-wrestled throughout the bout.

2023 Season 
Greene is set to start off the 2023 season against Marcelo Nunes on April 7, 2023 at PFL 2.

Personal life 
Greene enjoys crocheting in his spare time, having learned to crochet in 2008. He sells his crocheted item under the name "The  Crochet Boss" which is what his moniker was coined from.

Greene and his wife Kaiya have a son, Jack, and a daughter Olive.

Mixed martial arts record

|-
|Loss
|align=center|10–7
|Denis Goltsov
|Decision (unanimous)
|PFL 5
|
|align=center|3
|align=center|5:00
|Atlanta, Georgia, United States
|
|-
|Win
|align=center|10–6
|Danyelle Williams
|Technical Submission (arm-triangle choke)
|CES 68
|
|align=center|1
|align=center|4:03
|West Fargo, North Dakota, United States
|
|-
|Loss
|align=center|9–6
|Marcos Rogério de Lima
|Decision (unanimous)
|UFC on ESPN: Rodriguez vs. Waterson
|
|align=center|3
|align=center|5:00
|Las Vegas, Nevada, United States
|
|-
|Loss
|align=center|9–5
|Greg Hardy
|TKO (punches)
|UFC Fight Night: Hall vs. Silva
|
|align=center|2
|align=center|1:12
|Las Vegas, Nevada, United States
|
|-
|Win
|align=center|9–4
|Gian Villante
|Submission (arm-triangle choke)
|UFC on ESPN: Poirier vs. Hooker
|
|align=center|3
|align=center|3:44
|Las Vegas, Nevada, United States
|
|-
|Loss
|align=center|8–4
|Aleksei Oleinik
|Submission (armbar) 
|UFC 246 
|
|align=center|2
|align=center|4:38
|Las Vegas, Nevada, United States
| 
|-
|Loss
|align=center|8–3
|Sergei Pavlovich 
|TKO (punches)
|UFC Fight Night: Maia vs. Askren 
|
|align=center|1
|align=center|2:12
|Kallang, Singapore
| 
|-
|Win
|align=center|8–2
|Júnior Albini
|TKO (punches)
|UFC on ESPN: Ngannou vs. dos Santos 
|
|align=center|1
|align=center|3:38
|Minneapolis, Minnesota, United States
|
|-
|Win
|align=center|7–2
|Jeff Hughes
|Decision (split)
|UFC Fight Night: Lewis vs. dos Santos
|
|align=center|3
|align=center|5:00
|Wichita, Kansas. United States
|
|-
|Win
|align=center|6–2
|Michel Batista
|Submission (triangle choke)
|The Ultimate Fighter: Heavy Hitters Finale
|
|align=center|1
|align=center|2:14
|Las Vegas, Nevada, United States
|
|-
|Loss
|align=center|5–2
|Jeff Hughes
|Decision (unanimous)
|LFA 38
|
|align=center|5
|align=center|5:00
|Minneapolis, Minnesota, United States
|
|-
|Win
|align=center|5–1
|Parnell Davis
|Submission (arm-triangle choke)
|Driller Promotions: No Mercy 6
|
|align=center|1
|align=center|1:20
|Mahnomen, Minnesota, United States
|
|-
|Win
|align=center|4–1
|Jermaine McDermott
|Submission (triangle choke)
|LFA 19
|
|align=center|1
|align=center|3:06
|Sioux Falls, South Dakota, United States
|
|-
|Win
|align=center|3–1
|Zach Thumb
|KO (head kick)
|Legacy FC 60
|
|align=center|1
|align=center|0:25
|Hinckley, Minnesota, United States
|
|-
|Win
|align=center|2–1
|Kevin Asplund
|Submission (triangle choke)
|KOTC: Industrial Strength
|
|align=center|1
|align=center|1:57
|Carlton, Minnesota, United States
|
|-
|Loss
|align=center|1–1
|Dan Charles
|Decision (unanimous)
|Flawless FC 3
|
|align=center|3
|align=center|5:00
|Inglewood, California, United States
|
|-
|Win
|align=center|1–0
|Ed Carpenter
|Decision (split)
|Flawless FC 1
|
|align=center|3
|align=center|5:00
|Chicago, Illinois, United States
|
|-

Kickboxing record (Incomplete)

|-  bgcolor="#FFBBBB"
| 2017-2-24 || Loss ||align=left| Cătălin Moroșanu || Glory 38: Chicago|| Hoffman Estates, Illinois, USA, US|| TKO || 2 || 0:23 || 1-3
|-  bgcolor="#FFBBBB"
| 2016-7-22 || Loss ||align=left| Chi Lewis Parry || Glory 32: Virginia || Norfolk, Virginia, USA || KO  || 2 || 2:30 || 1-2 
|-  bgcolor="#FFBBBB" 
| 2016-2-26 || Loss ||align=left| Anderson Silva || Glory 27: Chicago || Hoffman Estates, Illinois, USA || Decision (Unanimous)|| 3 || 3:00  || 1-1
|-  bgcolor="#CCFFCC"
| 2016-7-22 || Win||align=left| Ashley Epps || Glory 21: San Diego || San Diego, California, USA || KO  || 1 || 2:11 || 1-0

See also
List of male mixed martial artists

References

External links
 
 

Date of birth missing (living people)
Heavyweight mixed martial artists
Mixed martial artists utilizing kickboxing
Mixed martial artists utilizing Brazilian jiu-jitsu
Living people
American male mixed martial artists
American practitioners of Brazilian jiu-jitsu
Ultimate Fighting Championship male fighters
Sportspeople from Norfolk, Virginia
Mixed martial artists from Virginia
Glory kickboxers
1986 births